Robert Clancy may refer to:
 Robert H. Clancy  (1882–1962), politician from the U.S. state of Michigan
 Professor Robert Clancy,  Australian developer of Broncostat which reduces attacks of bronchitis